Mesmes may be,

Mesmes language

People
Claude de Mesmes, comte d'Avaux
Jean-Antoine de Mesmes (diplomat)
Jean-Antoine de Mesmes (premier président)
Jean-Jacques de Mesmes

See also
Mesme (disambiguation)
Saint-Mesmes